Miguel de Jesús Fuentes Razo (born 29 September 1971) is a Mexican former professional footballer who played as a goalkeeper. He played for Tigres UANL during the 1995-96 season.

International career
He was a member of the Mexico national football team competing at the 1992 Summer Olympics in Barcelona, Spain. Miguel Fuentes was a squad member at the 1991 FIFA World Youth Championship held in Portugal, where he played three games.

References
FIFA

1971 births
Living people
Footballers from Guadalajara, Jalisco
Association football goalkeepers
Mexican footballers
Mexico youth international footballers
Mexico under-20 international footballers
Olympic footballers of Mexico
Footballers at the 1992 Summer Olympics
Club Celaya footballers
Club León footballers
Atlético Morelia players
Mexican football managers
C.D. Veracruz managers
Club Necaxa managers
Lobos BUAP managers
FC Juárez managers